Bob Thomas (born March 1, 1954 in Appalachia, Virginia) is a radio personality, actor, and writer.  He was one of the top radio announcers in Knoxville, Tennessee for 25 years.  As an actor, he has appeared in many films and hundreds of commercials.  He wrote two episodes of the popular TV show Lizzie McGuire.  In 2004, his voice was heard as "Slammin' Sammy" in the film Friday Night Lights.  
He is the father of actor Jake Thomas.

References

External links

Official website of B. T. Thomas

1965 births
Living people
People from Appalachia, Virginia
American male film actors
Radio personalities from Tennessee
American male television actors
American television writers
American male television writers
People from Knoxville, Tennessee
Male actors from Virginia
Male actors from Tennessee
Screenwriters from Virginia
Screenwriters from Tennessee